Michael J. Bouchard is an American politician who has served as Sheriff of Oakland County, Michigan since 1999. A member of the Republican Party, Bouchard previously served in the Michigan State Senate from 1991 to 1999, and as the Senate Majority Leader from 1998 to 1999. He was the unsuccessful Republican nominee for United States Senate in 2006, losing to incumbent Debbie Stabenow.

Bouchard is of French and Syrian Lebanese descent. In 2016, he was named Sheriff of the Year by the National Sheriffs' Association.

Career
Bouchard was born in Flint, Michigan. After graduating from Brother Rice High School in 1974, Bouchard attended Michigan State University majoring in criminal justice and police administration. Upon graduation Bouchard entered local law enforcement where he remained for thirteen years.

Bouchard was elected to the Michigan State Senate in 1991. He resigned as senator and majority floor leader in the Michigan State Senate when he was appointed Oakland County Sheriff in January 1999 following the untimely death of long time Sheriff John F. Nichols in December 1998.

Bouchard has served two terms as President of the Major County Sheriffs' Association, which is composed of sheriffs who serve in counties or parishes with a population of 500,000 or more. Bouchard is currently the organization's Vice President of Government Affairs.

In 2007, Bouchard endorsed former Massachusetts Governor Mitt Romney in the 2008 Republican presidential primaries. Romney went on to win the primary vote in Oakland County.

Bouchard ran for a U.S. Senate seat in 2006. He won the Republican nomination with 60 percent of the vote, but then lost to Debbie Stabenow, the incumbent Democratic senator.

In November 2012, Bouchard was elected to his fourth consecutive term as Oakland County Sheriff by an overwhelming majority, the largest number of votes cast for any candidate in Oakland County.

In 2019 he was named a Michigan Master Sheriff, in recognition of his 33 years of service.

2010 gubernatorial race

Bouchard joined business person Rick Snyder, state Senator Tom George, Congressman Peter Hoekstra and Michigan Attorney General Mike Cox as Republican candidates. Bouchard finished fourth out of five candidates in the primary, receiving 127,350 votes of the 1,044,925 votes cast.

Electoral history
2006 United States Senate election in Michigan 
Mike Bouchard (R), 41%
Debbie Stabenow (D) (inc.), 57%

2006 election for U.S. Senate - Republican Primary
Mike Bouchard (R), 60%
Keith Butler (R), 40%

Oakland County Sheriff's Office
 Re-elected Oakland County Sheriff, 2020
 Re-elected Oakland County Sheriff, 2016
 Re-elected Oakland County Sheriff, 2012
 Re-elected Oakland County Sheriff, 2008
 Re-elected Oakland County Sheriff, 2004
 Elected Oakland County Sheriff, 2000
 Appointed Sheriff of Oakland County, January 11, 1999

Michigan State Senate
 Elected Majority Floor Leader of the Michigan State Senate, 1998
 Re-elected to the State Senate, 1998
 Elected Assistant Majority Leader of the Michigan State Senate, 1995
 Re-elected to the State Senate, 1994
 Elected Assistant President Pro-Tempore of the Michigan State Senate, 1994
 Elected to the State Senate, 1991

Michigan House of Representatives
 Elected to the State House of Representatives, 1990

City Council
 Elected President Pro-Tempore of the Beverly Hills Council, 1987
 Elected to the Beverly Hills Village Council, 1986

References

External links
Sheriff Bouchard's Web site
Michigan Fallen Heroes Memorial Website

|-

|-

|-

1956 births
20th-century American politicians
American politicians of Lebanese descent
Brother Rice High School (Michigan) alumni
Candidates in the 2006 United States elections
Candidates in the 2010 United States elections
Living people
Republican Party members of the Michigan House of Representatives
Michigan sheriffs
Republican Party Michigan state senators
Michigan State University alumni
People from Oakland County, Michigan
Politicians from Flint, Michigan